Valentin Plătăreanu (15 November 1936 – 16 April 2019) was a Romanian actor, director and drama teacher.

Biography
From 1958 to 1980, he played more than 30 parts at the Theatre of Youth (Teatrul Tineretului) in Piatra Neamț, then at the National Theatre Bucharest, and has served as their Deputy Director. In 1978–79 he directed Hernani, by Victor Hugo; Much Ado About Nothing, by William Shakespeare; and The Rivals, by Richard Brinsley Sheridan.

Personal life
In 1983, Plătăreanu left Romania and settled in Germany with his wife, Doina, and his daughter, Alexandra Maria Lara.

Acting teacher career
In 1992, he founded the Charlottenburg Drama School (Schauspielschule Charlottenburg) with his partner, Henner Oft.

Movie parts

Film

Partea ta de vina (1963, Director: Mircea Mureșan) - Popescu
Răscoala (1965, Director: Mircea Mureșan)
Serata (1971, Director: Malvina Ursianu) - young man with the grave
Fratii Jderi (1974, Director: Mircea Drăgan)
Stephen the Great - Vaslui 1475 (1975, Director: Mircea Drăgan)
Cursa (1975, Director: Mircea Daneliuc)
Oil! (1977, Director: Mircea Drăgan) - Ionescu
Pentru patrie (1977, Director: Sergiu Nicolaescu) - Captain Lahovary
Războiul independenţei (1977, Director: Sergiu Nicolaescu) - Prince Lahovary
Din nou împreuna (1978, Director: George Cornea) - Directorul general
Un om în loden (1979, Director: Nicolae Margineanu)
Jachetele galbene (1979, Director: Dan Mironescu)
Santaj (1979, Director: Geo Saizescu)
Duelul (1979, Director: Sergiu Nicolaescu)
Ana si hotul (1981, Director: Virgil Calotescu)
Grabeste-te încet (1981, Director: Geo Saizescu)
Am o idee (1981, Director: Alecu Croitoru) - Pascu
Linistea din adîncuri (1982, Director: Malvina Ursianu) - Feciorul
Totul pentru fotbal (1982, Director: Andrei Blaier)
O lebada, iarna (1983, Director: Mircea Mureșan)
 (1987, Director: René Perraudin) - Scientist from KGB
Vorwärts (1990, Director: René Perraudin) - Lawyer
Mulo (1992, Director: Iva Svarcova)
Enemy at the Gates (2001, Director: Jean-Jacques Annaud) - General Schmidt (uncredited)
Berlin Is in Germany (2001, Director: Hannes Stöhr) - Victor Valentin
Cowgirl (2004, Director: Mark Schlichter) - Gangsterboss im Film Noir
 (2004, Director: Doris Dörrie) - Radu
Offset (2006, Director: Didi Danquart) - Mr. Herghelegiu
Free Rainer (2007, Director: Hans Weingartner) - Opa Pegah
Flores (2008, Short, Director: Felix von Boehm) - Gabriel Ramos

Television
Schimanski: Asyl · Part: General · Director: Ed. Berger · WDR
Tatort: "Der Prügelknabe" · Part: Milic · Director: Thomas Jauch · ARD
Für alle Fälle Stefanie · Part: Herr Marquardt · Director: div. · Sat.1
Siebenstein · Director: Hans-Henning Borgelt · ZDF
Tatort · Part: Dr. Salewic · Director: Robert Sigl · SWR
Ich schenk Dir meinen Mann · Part: Jaruslaw · Director: Karola Hattop · ZDF
Die 8. Todsünde · Part: Liwinsky · Director: Stefan Meyer · ARD
Victor Klemperer · Part: Natschew · Director: Kai Wessel · ARD
Tatort: "Undercover Camping" · Part: Emilio · Director: Jürgen Bretzinger · ARD
Liebling Kreuzberg · Part: Episode Lead · ARD
Grosse Freiheit · Director: Robert Sigl
 · Director: Heinrich Breloer · 2-Teiler · ZDF

Notes

External links
 

20th-century Romanian male actors
Romanian theatre directors
1936 births
2019 deaths
Romanian male film actors
Romanian male stage actors
Romanian male television actors
Male actors from Bucharest
Romanian emigrants to Germany